A Groan Tube is a toy, which when turned on one end, makes a distinct 'groan' sound. This is due to a noise maker in the tube, that when it falls, vibrates in the air making the noise.

The groan tube was invented in the early 1960s by Japanese toy manufacturer Kureo. The toy was first sold as 'Magic Noise Tube" (魔法音管). Mattel was the first company to sell the product in the United States in 1973. The Jibba Jabber toy, made by Ertl, produced a similar sound.

In popular culture 
It was also utilized in the Italian comedy show LOL: chi ride è fuori released on Amazon Prime Video. The Italian comedian Frank Matano used the Groan Tube for comedic purposes and it immediately went viral in all the country.

See also
Moo box

References

1960s toys
Toy instruments and noisemakers
Party favors
Plastic toys